Doris pseudoverrucosa is a species of sea slug, a dorid nudibranch, a marine gastropod mollusc in the family Dorididae.

Distribution
This species was described from Naples, Italy.

Description
The description given by von Ihering is translated as follows:

References

Dorididae
Gastropods described in 1886